Márton Bauer is a Hungarian sprint canoer who competed in the late 1990s. He won three silver medals at the ICF Canoe Sprint World Championships (K-4 500 m: 1998; K-4 1000 m: 1997, 1998).

References

Hungarian male canoeists
Living people
Year of birth missing (living people)
ICF Canoe Sprint World Championships medalists in kayak
20th-century Hungarian people